Miguel Angel Villamonte (born 12 October 1967) is an Argentine former professional footballer who played as a midfielder for clubs of Argentina and Chile.

Honours
Cobreloa
 Chilean Championship 1988

Argentina youth
 Torneo Cruz del Sur: 1982

References
 

1968 births
Living people
Argentine footballers
Footballers from Buenos Aires
Association football midfielders
Club Atlético Atlanta footballers
All Boys footballers
Cobreloa footballers
Argentine expatriate footballers
Argentine expatriate sportspeople in Chile
Expatriate footballers in Chile